Howmeh Rural District is a rural district (dehestan) in the Central District of Rasht County, Gilan Province, Iran. At the 2006 census, its population was 20,703, with 5,832 families. The rural district has 25 villages.

References 

Rural Districts of Gilan Province
Rasht County